Sir Samuel Chisholm, 1st Baronet  (23 September 1836 – 27 September 1923), was a Scottish Liberal politician and Lord Provost of Glasgow.

Chisholm stood unsuccessfully as a Liberal candidate for Glasgow Camlachie in the 1895 general election. He was elected to the Corporation of the City of Glasgow from Woodside Ward, and was Lord Provost of Glasgow between 1899 and 1902. He received criticism for spending rather freely on public receptions and events during his tenure as Lord Provost, and was defeated from the ward in the municipal elections in early November 1902.

Chisholm was noted for a baronetcy in the November 1902 Birthday Honours list, and was created a baronet, of Belhaven Terrace in the Parish of Govan in the County of the City of Glasgow, and of St John's Mount, Dunblane, in the Parish of Dunblane in the County of Perth, on 28 November 1902.

He received the honorary Doctor of Laws (DLL) from the University of Glasgow in June 1901, was appointed a Deputy Lieutenant of Lanarkshire in September 1901, and a Deputy Lieutenant of the County of the City of Glasgow in December 1902.

He died in September 1923, aged 87, at which time the title became extinct.

References

External links
www.theglasgowstory.com Sir Samuel Chisholm

1836 births
1923 deaths
Baronets in the Baronetage of the United Kingdom
Liberal Party (UK) parliamentary candidates
Deputy Lieutenants of Lanarkshire
Lord Provosts of Glasgow